Andreas Malm (born ) is a Swedish author and an associate professor of human ecology at Lund University. He is on the editorial board of the academic journal Historical Materialism, and has been described as a Marxist. Naomi Klein, who quoted Malm in her book This Changes Everything, describes him as "one of the most original thinkers on the subject" of climate change.

Career 
In 2010, Malm joined the Socialistiska Partiet; he had been in contact with the party since attending a summer camp they ran in 1997.

In 2012, Malm defended his thesis (which later became the book Fossil Capital) to obtain a PhD from Lund University.

Malm has authored several books and is a contributor to the magazine Jacobin. In his book How to Blow Up a Pipeline: Learning to Fight in a World on Fire, published in January 2021, he argued that sabotage and property damage would be logical components of the movement against climate change.

In a May 2021 article in The Guardian, Brett Christophers wrote that research by Malm suggests that manufacturers during the Industrial Revolution switched from water power to steam not because steam was cheaper but because it was more profitable. In particular, steam allowed prime movers to be located near cheap labor rather than bound to suitable waterways.

In September 2021, Malm was a guest on The New Yorker Radio Hour, where he echoed the central claim of How to Blow Up a Pipeline by advocating for the climate movement to utilize sabotage as a tactic and embrace a diversity of tactics.

Books 
 Iran on the Brink: Rising Workers and Threats of War, written with Shora Esmailian, published 2007 by Pluto Press
Fossil Capital: The Rise of Steam Power and the Roots of Global Warming, published 2016 by Verso Books and awarded the Deutscher Memorial Prize
 The Progress of This Storm: Nature and Society in a Warming World, published 2017 by Verso Books
 Corona, Climate, Chronic Emergency: War Communism in the Twenty-First Century, published 2020 by Verso Books
 How to Blow Up a Pipeline: Learning to Fight in a World on Fire, published 2021 by Verso Books
 White Skin, Black Fuel: On the Danger of Fossil Fascism, written with The Zetkin Collective, published 2021 by Verso Books

See also

References

Further reading

External links 

Official page on Lund University website

21st-century Swedish writers
21st-century Swedish journalists
Human ecologists
Living people
Year of birth missing (living people)
Swedish Marxist writers
Academic staff of Lund University
Lund University alumni
Swedish Marxists
Deutscher Memorial Prize winners